Prairie Creek is a stream in the U.S. state of Iowa. It is a tributary to the Iowa River.

Prairie Creek was descriptively named for the prairie along its course.

References

Rivers of Johnson County, Iowa
Rivers of Iowa